The 2002 WNBA season was the sixth season for the Houston Comets. They made their best record in two years at 24-8. Despite with that, they eventually lost in the first round to the Utah Starzz.

Offseason

WNBA Draft

Regular season

Season standings

Season schedule

Player stats

References

Houston Comets seasons
Houston
Houston